Sarah Hughes (28 November 1972 – 5 April 2021), was a British journalist, known to her readers by the pseudonym 'Lady Sarah'. She wrote for several British national newspapers including The Telegraph, The Independent, inews, and  the Observer and Guardian, in which she published regular reviews of television series including Line of Duty, Peaky Blinders, Indian Summers and the Game of Thrones.

Earlier in her career she worked in the United States and wrote on basketball and college football for the New York Daily News. She subsequently published on horse racing and football. In 2004, while working for The Independent, she co-authored a report on abuses by United Nations peacekeepers in the Democratic Republic of Congo (DRC), which led to being shortlisted for an Amnesty International award, and later to an investigation of the allegations.

During the COVID-19 pandemic in the United Kingdom, she wrote a series of articles for The Observer, reporting regularly on life during lockdown after being diagnosed with advanced breast cancer.

Early life and education
Sarah Hughes, who was of Catholic faith, was born on 28 November 1972 in London, the daughter of Sean P. F. Hughes, an orthopaedic surgeon and his wife Felicity, a microbiologist. She was the eldest of their three children (two daughters and one son). After completing her early education in Edinburgh she sat A levels at Woldingham, Surrey, and subsequently attended St Andrews University, where she graduated MA in modern history. She then gained two further masters degrees; in journalism from New York University and in life writing from the University of East Anglia (UEA). For her dissertation on the Irish nationalist Roger Casement, she won UEA's Lorna Sage prize.

Early career
Hughes began her career in journalism in the United States, initially reporting on basketball and college football for the New York Daily News. She then published on horse racing and football. Before moving on to write for British national newspapers, including The Telegraph, The Independent, The Independent on Sunday, Metro, inews, The Observer and The Guardian,
she worked for the Manchester Evening News, and won their feature writer of the year award twice in a row.

In 2004, while writing for The Independent she co-authored a report with photojournalist Kate Holt on abuses by United Nations peacekeepers in the Democratic Republic of Congo (DRC). It was one of several early case reports following more than 30 interviews with girls in a refugee camp in Bunia and one under the care of United Nations Children's Fund (UNICEF), and other journalists subsequently followed with further similar reports. Their work was described by Simon Cottle, professor of media and communication, as "journalism taking its responsibility to report seriously", and earned them a place on the shortlist for an Amnesty International award in that year. Their case reports included that of rape and abuse of children, and the exchange of sex-for-food. It led to an investigation of MONUC (a United Nations mission in the DRC), by the UN's Office of Internal Oversight.

Later career

Hughes later specialised in journalism pertaining to television and entertainment, becoming known to her readers by the pseudonym 'Lady Sarah'. She published regular reviews on television series including Line of Duty, Peaky Blinders and Indian Summers, and contributed to The Guardian’s regular blog on Game of Thrones.

She also wrote several reviews of books, including The Mirror and the Light by Hilary Mantel, An American Marriage by Tayari Jones, and Deborah Orr's Motherwell: A Girlhood. In 2017 she co-authored, with her father, the Keat's Memorial Lecture, on the influence of John Keats's medical training on his poetry, delivered at the Worshipful Society of Apothecaries.

Some of her articles focused on her personal experiences, including the births of her stillborns and her diagnosis of breast cancer. In 2020, during the COVID-19 pandemic in the United Kingdom, she published a series of articles for The Observer reporting regularly on life during lockdown after being told that her breast cancer had now advanced . These included her account of March 2020, of the interruption and delay in her cancer care, and being informed that should she contract COVID-19, she would not receive an intensive care bed. Her account in November 2020, included her fear of "missing out as life ticks away, the challenges of accessing treatment, and fears about cancer research funding".

Personal and family
Hughes married Kris with whom she had two children. Two of her later pregnancies had ended in stillbirths. Hughes was the best friend of the novelist Harriet Tyce.

Her obituary noted that she enjoyed horse racing; Prix de l'Arc de Triomphe, Punchestown in Kildare and Cheltenham. Along with her husband she also supported the British football team Tottenham Hotspur.

Death and legacy

Hughes died at home from breast cancer at the age of 48 on 5 April 2021, a day after her last article was published. Iris, one of her stillbirths, was buried with her.

She is survived by her husband and two children. Her death was reported in The Guardian, in which tributes were paid by its editor-in-chief Katharine Viner, The Observer's editor Paul Webster, and writers Jed Mercurio and Sarah Phelps.

The Sarah Hughes Memorial Lecture at the Royal Society of Medicine, is named for her. The inaugural lecture was delivered in December 2021 by Mercurio, as a conversation with health and social care editor at Channel 4 News, Victoria MacDonald. A collection of her essays, Holding Tight, Letting Go, was published posthumously in 2022. It includes chapters by Tyce and Tilly Bagshawe, and ends with a note from her husband.

Selected publications
 (Co-authored with Kate Holt)
 (Co-authored with Kate Holt)
 (Co-authored with S. P. F. Hughes)

References

External links

1972 births
2021 deaths
Alumni of the University of East Anglia
British reporters and correspondents
British women television journalists
People from London
Place of birth missing
Deaths from breast cancer
Alumni of the University of St Andrews